The lightweight class was a judo event held as part of the Judo at the 1964 Summer Olympics programme. The weight class was the lightest contested, and allowed judokas of up to sixty-eight kilograms. The competition was held on Tuesday, October 20, 1964.

Twenty-five judokas from eighteen nations competed.

Results

Elimination round

The twenty-five competitors were divided into seven pools of three and one pool of four. Each pool played a round-robin tournament, with the winner of the pool advancing to the quarterfinals. Pool D was the only one to require a playoff, which was won by Chang.

Pool A

Pool B

Pool C

Pool D

Pool E

Pool F

Stefano Gamba did not compete.

Pool G

Group 8

Knockout rounds

The remaining eight judokas competed in a single elimination bracket. Losers in the quarterfinals were placed 5-8 while both losers in the semifinals won bronze medals.

Sources

References

External links
 

M68
Judo at the Summer Olympics Men's Lightweight